Madau is an island of the Woodlark Islands group, in the Solomon Sea and Milne Bay Province of Papua New Guinea.

Geography
Its area is 32 km².

At the census of population of 2000, the island hat 758 inhabitants. 307 were in the principal village of Madau, located in the centre of the island; 237 in Muneiveyova in the north; and 178 in Boagis in the south.

Natural history
There is only one species of mammal on the island, the ''Woodlark Cuscus (Phalanger lullulae).  It is in the Trobriand Islands rain forests ecoregion.

See also

References

Woodlark Islands
Islands of Milne Bay Province